The Outcasts of Poker Flat is a 1952 American Western film directed by Joseph M. Newman and starring Anne Baxter and Dale Robertson. The screenplay is based on a short story of the same name by Bret Harte. Harte's story has been brought to film at least five times, including in 1919 with Harry Carey and in 1937 with Preston Foster.

Plot
Ryker, a murderous western outlaw, leaves death and destruction behind after a robbery in Poker Flat and leaves the loot with his wife, Cal, before riding off. A while later, the shaken town decides to banish all undesirables. They include gambler John Oakhurst, saloonkeeper and madam The Duchess and the town drunk, Jake, as well as Cal, who had been spotted with Ryker, even though no one knows they are husband and wife.

The others follow Oakhurst, not knowing what else to do. They come across young Tom Dakin and pregnant sweetheart Piney, who were headed for Poker Flat to be wed. In a snowstorm, John leads them to a remote cabin. They have no horses, so Tom takes off for Poker Flat on foot to get help, given $500 of the stolen money by Cal in case he needs to pay someone to form a rescue party.

Ryker turns up, also on foot. He is shocked to find Cal, becomes suspicious and beats her, as well as bullying the others and eating all of their remaining food. He shoots Jake just for taking a bottle of whiskey. Cal develops a bond with Oakhurst and eventually reveals her situation to him. A fight begins after Ryker shoots and kills The Duchess in cold blood, and Oakhurst is able to strangle him to death. Some head back toward town, when the rescue party arrives, while Oakhurst and Cal go the other way.

Cast
 Anne Baxter as Cal
 Dale Robertson as John Oakhurst
 Miriam Hopkins as Mrs. Shipton aka 'The Duchess'
 Cameron Mitchell as Ryker
 Craig Hill as Tom Dakin
 Barbara Bates as Piney Wilson
 William H. Lynn as Jake Watterson
 Dick Rich as Drunk

References

External links
 
 
 
 
 The Outcasts of Poker Flat movie review at the New York Times

1952 Western (genre) films
1952 films
American Western (genre) films
American black-and-white films
1950s English-language films
20th Century Fox films
Films directed by Joseph M. Newman
Films based on works by Bret Harte
Films scored by Hugo Friedhofer
1950s American films